Soursac is a commune in the Corrèze department in central France.

Geography
The Luzège forms most of the commune's western boundary, then flows into the Dordogne, which forms the commune's southern and eastern boundaries.

Population

See also
Communes of the Corrèze department

References

Communes of Corrèze
Corrèze communes articles needing translation from French Wikipedia